The Red Barron Duo is an album by pianist Kenny Barron and bassist Red Mitchell recorded in Stockholm and released on the Dutch Storyville label.

Reception 

In his review on Allmusic, Scott Yanow noted: "Their interpretations swing, are sometimes intuitive and are full of subtle surprises. Barron has since been recognized as a giant of modern mainstream piano while the late Mitchell's virtuosity was never in question. This combination works!"

Track listing 
 "The Girl Next Door" (Ralph Blane, Hugh Martin) – 6:14
 "Oleo" (Sonny Rollins) – 6:19
 "Sunshower" (Kenny Barron) – 9:40
 "Bureau Blues" (Red Mitchell) – 6:59
 "Finally" (Mitchell) – 7:22
 "On the Sunny Side of the Street" (Jimmy McHugh, Dorothy Fields) – 6:40
 "Namely You" (Gene de Paul, Johnny Mercer) – 8:42 Bonus track on CD
 "Darn That Dream" (Jimmy Van Heusen, Eddie DeLange) – 7:05 Bonus track on CD

Personnel 
Kenny Barron – piano
Red Mitchell – bass

References 

Kenny Barron albums
Red Mitchell albums
1988 albums
Storyville Records albums